Michele Rizzo (born 16 September 1982) is a retired Italian former rugby union player. His preferred position was prop but he can also play as a hooker.  Rizzo last played for Petrarca, the club where he spent most of his career and where he made his debut in Serie A1 halfway through the 2000–01 season in a match against Viadana. He spent four years between 2014–2018 in England playing 38 times (scoring 2 tries) for Leicester Tigers.

Career
Rizzo was born in Dolo, province of Venice, but spent his early years living in Padua where he attended the Istituto professionale alberghiero Pietro d'Abano. He grew up playing for Petrarca alongside his younger brother Marco, of which he also was the captain for two seasons (2007–08 and 2008–09). With the reputation of being a solid and aggressive player, good in scrummage but who also loves playing ball in hand with surprising speed, Rizzo was seen as one of the best young Italian props. He has been capped by the Italy national rugby union team, making his debut playing 4 minutes against Australia in 2005. He was part of the Italy "A" squad that finished as runners-up at the 2009 IRB Nations Cup. In the same year, he joined Benetton Treviso, where he formed one of the best cores of props in the league alongside Lorenzo Cittadini and Alberto De Marchi. With Benetton, Rizzo won a Scudetto and Coppa Italia double in 2009–10.

In 2012, Rizzo was selected by Italy's head coach Jacques Brunel to play in his first Six Nations. On 23 June 2014, Rizzo along with teammate Leonardo Ghiraldini made his move to join Leicester Tigers in the English Aviva Premiership from the 2014–15 season. In the same year, after playing in the 2015 Rugby World Cup in England, Rizzo tore his anterior cruciate ligament, in the same knee where he suffered another bad injury in 2002, missing the rest of the season. He spent the early part of the 2017–18 season for Edinburgh Rugby of the Pro14 on a short term emergency loan. He returned to Leicester in December and was immediately named in the club's Champions' Cup squad. On 30 May 2018, Rizzo returned to Petrarca on a two years deal where he ended his career.

Rizzo announced his retirement on March 27, 2020, age 37. During his career, Rizzo was one of many Italian rugby players under contract with Japanese sports equipment Asics. In June 2009, he married his girlfriend Silvia Rampazzo, the couple have two children, Sara and Giulio. He lives in Verona where he works as an under-18 coach for Verona Rugby.

Honours
 Italian championship
 Benetton Treviso: 2009–10
Coppa Italia
 Petrarca: 2000–01
 Benetton Treviso: 2009–10
Supercoppa d'Italia
 Benetton Treviso: 2009
Anglo-Welsh Cup
 Leicester Tigers: 2016–17

References

External links
Michele Rizzo profile on ESPN
Michele Rizzo stats on Itsrugby
Article on Rizzo's international hopes

1982 births
Italian rugby union players
Living people
Petrarca Rugby players
Benetton Rugby players
Leicester Tigers players
Edinburgh Rugby players
Rugby union props
Rugby union hookers
Italy international rugby union players
People from Dolo
Italian expatriate rugby union players
Italian expatriate sportspeople in England
Expatriate rugby union players in England
Italian rugby union coaches
Sportspeople from the Metropolitan City of Venice